Suillia innotata, is a European species of Heleomyzidae.

References

Heleomyzidae
Diptera of Europe
Taxa named by Theodor Becker
Insects described in 1908